Sermoneta is a hill town and comune in the province of Latina (Lazio), central Italy.

It is a walled  hill town,  with  a 13th-century Romanesque cathedral called Cathedral of Santa Maria Assunta and  a massive castle, built by the Caetani family.  The Cistercian Valvisciolo Abbey is located nearby. The churches of San Giuseppe (mainly 16th century) and San Michele (mainly 12th century) still stand.

A Jewish community engaged in the commerce of fish and lending is attested there from the 13th to the 16th centuries, when the community was removed following Pope Pius V's Papal Bull of Expulsion  Hebraeorum gens sola, (1569) which restricted Jewish residency to Rome and Ancona.

Sermoneta is the hometown of the humanist Aldo Manuzio and eighteenth-century painter Antonio Cavallucci.

Scenes of the 2007 film Silk featuring Keira Knightley were filmed in Sermoneta.

The 2015 short film Italian Miracle was filmed in the town.

In 1978, an episode of Return of the Saint was filmed there: the town was known as Santa Maria.

Notable residents 
 Girolamo Siciolante (1521-1575), painter; 
 Fabritio Caroso (1526/1535 – 1605/1620), Renaissance dancing master, poet, and author of dancing manuals;
 Antonio Cavallucci (1752–95), painter;
 Ubaldo Righetti (1963- ), retired football player;
 Cesare Battisti (1954- ), ex terrorist;
 Elena Santarelli (1981- ), actress;

Twin towns
 Arborea, Italy
 Saint-Antoine-l'Abbaye, France
 Atalanti, Greece

References

Hilltowns in Lazio